Nina Fyodorovna Agapova (30 May 1926 – 19 November 2021) was a Soviet and Russian actress.

Life and career
Agapova was born in Moscow in May 1926. She graduated from Gerasimov Institute of Cinematography in 1951.

In 1987, she was named an Honored Artist of the RSFSR.

Agapova died on 19 November 2021, at the age of 95.

Selected filmography
The Unamenables (1959) as host of the contest
Dead Souls (1960) as lady at the ball (uncredited)
Give Me a Book of Complaints (1965) as barmaid Zinaida
A Literature Lesson (1968) as student's mother
Seven Old Men and a Girl (1968) as Kravtsova
Adventures of the Yellow Suitcase (1970) as mother
The Twelve Chairs (1971) as soloist of theater 
Grandads-Robbers (1971) as the museum keeper
The Crown of the Russian Empire, or Once Again the Elusive Avengers (1971) as an american woman with a parrot
Ilf and Petrov Rode a Tram (1972) as Vera, Kapitulov's wife
Northern Rhapsody (1974) as correspondent
The Tavern on Pyatnitskaya (1978) as buyer of a ring
The Invisible Man (1984) as Jenny Hall
Forgotten Melody for a Flute (1987) as Tatyana Georgievna, secretary
The Kreutzer Sonata (1987) as Leocadia Petrovna
Where is the Nophelet? (1988) as aunt Emma
Private Detective, or Operation Cooperation (1989) as Gypsy woman
The Envy of Gods (2000) as Kaleria Georgievna

References

External links

1926 births
2021 deaths
20th-century Russian actresses
21st-century Russian actresses
Actresses from Moscow
Gerasimov Institute of Cinematography alumni
Honored Artists of the RSFSR
Russian film actresses
Russian stage actresses
Soviet film actresses
Soviet stage actresses
Burials at Kuntsevo Cemetery